Oswald Jozef Leroy (born 1936 in Passendale, Belgium, died 7 September 2022) is a Belgian mathematician known for his contributions to theoretical acousto-optics. 

Leroy's biggest achievement was a theoretical study of the interaction of light with two adjacent ultrasonic beams under different conditions in terms of beam shape, frequency content and intensity. Understanding of this phenomenon was very important in the 1970s when new acousto-optic devices were developed (mainly due to novel developments in laser technology) that utilized adjacent ultrasonic beams. Such devices were being used in optical modulators, optical scanners, information processing
, optical filtering and frequency-spectrum analysis. Before his contribution only the interaction of light with one ultrasonic beam was understood. Since then, acousto-optic devices have been used in telecommunication and military applications.

Career

Leroy received his PhD from Ghent University in the group of Robert A. Mertens for his thesis entitled Diffraction of light by ultrasound. He worked as an assistant professor at Ghent University from 1966 to 1972 and has been a tenured professor at the Catholic University of Leuven since 1972. New developments in laser physics formed the ground for collaborations between the team of Leroy and different other laboratories. He was a guest professor at the Paris Diderot University and Université de Bordeaux, the University of Tennessee and the Tokyo Institute of Technology. Furthermore, he has collaborated with the University of Gdansk, Georgetown University, and the University of Houston. He retired in 2001 and received the title of emeritus professor.

Awards

In 2001 he has received the ‘Médaille étrangère’ of the French Acoustical Society.

Selected articles 

 Leroy O., "Diffraction of light by two adjacent parallel ultrasonic-waves", journal of the acoustical society of America 51(1), 148, 1972
 Leroy O., "Theory of diffraction of light by ultrasonic-waves consisting of a fundamental tone and its first n − 1 harmonics", ultrasonics 10(4), 182, 1972
 Leroy O., "Diffraction of light by 2 adjacent parallel ultrasonic beams", acustica 29(5), 303–310, 1973
 Leroy O., "General symmetry properties of diffraction pattern in diffraction of light by parallel adjacent ultrasonic beams", journal of sound and vibration 26(3), 389–393, 1973
 Leroy O., "Diffraction of light by 2 parallel adjacent ultrasonic-waves, having same wavelengths", journal of sound and vibration 32(2), 241–249, 1974
 Leroy, O., "TI light-diffraction caused by adjacent ultrasonics", IEEE transactions on sonics and ultrasonics su22(3), 233, 1975
 Poleunis F., Leroy O., "Diffraction of light by 2 adjacent parallel ultrasonic-waves, one being a fundamental tone and other its 2nd harmonic", journal of sound and vibration 58(4), 509–515, 1978
 Leroy O., Mertens R., "Diffraction of light by adjacent parallel ultrasonic-waves with arbitrary frequencies (noa-method)", acustica 26(2), 96, 1972
 W. Hereman, R. Mertens, F. Verheest, O. Leroy, J.M. Claeys, E. Blomme, "Interaction of light and ultrasound : Acoustoopics", Physicalia Magazine 6(4), 213–245, 1984.

Books 
 Physical Acoustics – Fundamentals and Applications, M.A. Breazeale O. Leroy (Eds.), Plenum US, 1991
 Advances in Acousto-Optics : 5th International Meeting of the European Acousto-Optical Club, Oswald Leroy (Edt.), Institute of Physics, 2001.

References

1935 births
Belgian mathematicians
Ghent University alumni
Academic staff of Ghent University
Living people